The 2016 Blancpain GT Series Endurance Cup was the sixth season of the Blancpain GT Series Endurance Cup. The season started on 24 April at Monza and ended on 18 September at the Nürburgring. The season featured five rounds, with each race lasting for a duration of three hours besides the 24 Hours of Spa and the 1000 km Paul Ricard events. After developing their partnership, Blancpain and the SRO decided that 2016 would see both the Sprint and Endurance Series further integrated into the Blancpain GT Series, putting the emphasis on the prestigious overall drivers' and manufacturers' titles causing the Endurance Series name to change from Blancpain Endurance Series to Blancpain GT Series Endurance Cup.

Calendar
On 18 September 2015, the Stéphane Ratel Organisation announced the 2016 calendar.

Entry list

Race results
Bold indicates overall winner.

Championship standings
Scoring system
Championship points were awarded for the first ten positions in each race. The pole-sitter also received one point and entries were required to complete 75% of the winning car's race distance in order to be classified and earn points. Individual drivers were required to participate for a minimum of 25 minutes in order to earn championship points in any race.

Race points

1000 km Paul Ricard points

24 Hours of Spa points
Points were awarded after six hours, after twelve hours and at the finish.

Drivers' championships

Overall

Pro-Am Cup

Am Cup

Teams' championships

Overall

Pro-Am Cup

Am Cup

See also
2016 Blancpain GT Series
2016 Blancpain GT Series Sprint Cup

Notes

References

External links

 Endurance Cup
Blancpain GT Series Endurance Cup